Shalva Ogbaidze (born 1 August 2002) is a Georgian professional footballer who plays as a forward for Regionalliga Nordost club Viktoria Berlin.

Club career
After playing youth football for BFC Dynamo, 1. FC Magdeburg and Viktoria Berlin, Ogbaidze was promoted to Viktoria Berlin's first team in summer 2021. He made his professional debut as an 84th-minute substitute in a 2–1 win over Viktoria Köln on 25 July 2021.

International career
Ogbaidze has represented Georgia at under-17 and under-18 international levels.

Career statistics

References

External links

2002 births
Living people
German footballers
Footballers from Georgia (country)
Association football forwards
Berliner FC Dynamo players
1. FC Magdeburg players
FC Viktoria 1889 Berlin players
3. Liga players
Georgia (country) youth international footballers